Ferenc Kellner (27 October 1932 – 17 April 2010) was a Hungarian boxer. He competed in the men's lightweight event at the 1960 Summer Olympics.

References

External links
 

1932 births
2010 deaths
Hungarian male boxers
Olympic boxers of Hungary
Boxers at the 1960 Summer Olympics
Martial artists from Budapest
Lightweight boxers